The following is a list of notable deaths in December 2018.

Entries for each day are listed alphabetically by surname. A typical entry lists information in the following sequence:
 Name, age, country of citizenship at birth, subsequent country of citizenship (if applicable), reason for notability, cause of death (if known), and reference.

December 2018

1
Ken Berry, 85, American actor (F Troop, Mayberry R.F.D., Mama's Family).
Taramon Bibi, 62, Bangladeshi independence militant (Mukti Bahini).
 Tony Briscoe, 79, South African swimmer 
Averroes Bucaram, 64, Ecuadorian politician, Speaker of National Congress (1985–1986, 1990) and MP (1984–1986, 1988–1992).
Ennio Fantastichini, 63, Italian actor (Open Doors, At the End of the Night, Loose Cannons), Donatello winner (2010), leukemia.
Frederick Fasehun, 83, Nigerian physician and politician, founder of the Oodua Peoples Congress.
P. M. Forni, 67, Italian-American academic, Parkinson's disease.
Shan Goshorn, 61, American Cherokee artist, cancer.
Anwar Hossain, 70, Bangladeshi photographer.
Ivan Katardžiev, 92, Macedonian historian.
Vivian Lynn, 87, New Zealand artist.
Phineas Makhurane, Zimbabwean academic, Vice-Chancellor of the National University of Science and Technology.
Dave Mantel, 37, Dutch actor (Goede tijden, slechte tijden).
Bernd Martin, 63, German footballer (VfB Stuttgart, Bayern Munich, West Germany).
Judy McBurney, 70, Australian actress (Prisoner, Always Greener, The Young Doctors), cancer.
Patricia Head Minaldi, 59, American federal judge, United States District Court for the Western District of Louisiana (since 2003).
Calvin Newborn, 85, American jazz guitarist.
Maria Pacôme, 95, French actress.
K. Punnaiah, 94, Indian judge and politician, MLA (1955–1961).
Pauls Putniņš, 81, Latvian playwright, journalist and politician.
Scott Stearney, 58, American vice admiral, Commander of the Fifth Fleet (2018).
Marvin Terrell, 80, American football player (Dallas Texans, Kansas City Chiefs).
Stefanie Tücking, 56, German radio and television presenter (Südwestrundfunk), pulmonary embolism.
Jody Williams, 83, American blues musician, cancer.
Zhang Ouying, 43, Chinese football player (China national team) and coach, lung cancer.
Shoucheng Zhang, 55, Chinese-born American physicist, member of the National Academy of Sciences.

2
Paul 'Trouble' Anderson, 59, British DJ.
Séry Bailly, 70, Ivorian writer and politician, Minister of Communication (2002–2003), complications from surgery.
Jean-François Ballester, 53, French figure skating coach, heart attack.
Lothar Baumgarten, 74, German conceptual artist.
Ugo De Censi, 94, Italian-Peruvian priest.
Martin B. Dickman, 65, American biologist.
Wilmer Clemont Fields, 96, American Southern Baptist minister and newspaper editor.
Al Frazier, 83, American football player (Toronto Argonauts, Ottawa Rough Riders, Denver Broncos).
Sergey Nikolayevich Popov, 89, Soviet Olympic hurdler.
Luan Qerimi, 89, Albanian actor.
Perry Robinson, 80, American jazz musician.
Gunwantrao Rambhau Sarode, 78, Indian politician, member of the Lok Sabha (1991–2001).
Paul Sherwen, 62, English racing cyclist (1987 National Champion) and sportscaster, heart failure.
William James Lanyon Smith, 96, New Zealand naval officer.
Michael James Snyder, 68, American business executive, CEO of Red Robin (2000–2005), suicide by gunshot.

3
Markus Beyer, 47, German Olympic boxer (1992, 1996), WBC super middleweight champion (1999–2000, 2003–2004, 2004–2006).
Andrei Bitov, 81, Russian writer.
Philip Bosco, 88, American actor (Lend Me a Tenor, Working Girl, My Best Friend's Wedding), Tony winner (1989), complications from dementia.
Justin Cartwright, 75, South African-born British novelist.
Albert Frère, 92, Belgian businessman.
Fred Greenstein, 88, American political scientist.
Giorgio Grilz, 88, Italian Olympic swimmer (1952).
Florence Hui, 44, Hong Kong politician, Undersecretary for Home Affairs (2008–2017), breast cancer.
Toby Jessel, 84, British politician, MP (1970–1997).
Tom Johnson, 73, American politician, member of the Illinois House of Representatives and Senate, cancer.
Kim Chol-man, 98, North Korean politician and military officer, Member of the Politburo (1980–1981), bladder cancer.
Elżbieta Krysińska, 90, Polish Olympic athlete (1952).
Karre Mastanamma, 107, Indian internet chef.
Roger Mercer, 74, British archaeologist.
Mendi Msimang, 78, South African politician, Treasurer of the African National Congress (1997–2017).
Mervin E. Muller, 90, American computer scientist and statistician.
Geoff Murphy, 80, New Zealand film director (Goodbye Pork Pie, Young Guns II, Under Siege 2: Dark Territory).
Josep Lluís Núñez, 87, Spanish businessman, President of F.C. Barcelona (1978–2000).
Miguel Primo de Rivera y Urquijo, 84, Spanish aristocrat (Duke of Primo de Rivera) and politician, Mayor of Jerez (1965–1971) and Senator.
Robert F. Ruth, 97, American politician, member of the South Dakota House of Representatives (1969–1970). 
Hans-Günther Thalheim, 94, German linguist and writer.
Alex Wizbicki, 97, American football player (Buffalo Bills, Green Bay Packers).
Kenneth Yen, 53, Taiwanese businessman, Chairman of China Motor Corporation and Yulon, esophageal cancer.

4
Kadyrzhan Batyrov, 62, Kyrgyz businessman and politician, heart attack.
Ivan Derventski, 86, Bulgarian footballer 
Nh. Dini, 82, Indonesian novelist and feminist, traffic collision.
Selma Engel-Wijnberg, 96, Dutch Holocaust survivor, escapee from Sobibor.
Lester Kinsolving, 90, American political radio host (WCBM).
Michael McComie, 46, Trinidadian football player and manager (Joe Public), brain tumour.
Sidy Lamine Niasse, 68, Senegalese press owner (WalFadjri).
Sam Nover, 77, American sportscaster (NBC, WKBD-TV, WPXI).
Nika Rurua, 50, Georgian politician, Minister of Culture (2009–2012), heart attack.

5
John Armstrong, 83, New Zealand politician, MP (1990–1993).
Evy Berggren, 84,  Swedish gymnast, Olympic champion (1952).
Peter Boizot, 89, British restaurateur (PizzaExpress) and football club owner (Peterborough United).
Alex Boraine, 87, South African politician, MP (1974–1986).
Marie-Thérèse Bourquin, 102, Belgian lawyer.
Dynamite Kid, 60, English professional wrestler (WWF, NJPW, Stampede).
Thor Hansen, 71, Norwegian poker player, cancer.
Jim House, 70, American politician, member of the Arkansas House of Representatives (2007–2011), tractor accident.
Jim Jamieson, 75, American professional golfer.
Inge Johansen, 90, Norwegian engineer and educator, rector of the Norwegian Institute of Technology (1976–1984).
Gary McPherson, 82, American college basketball coach (VMI, Alderson Broaddus, West Virginia).
Lynn Schindler, 74, American politician, member of the Washington House of Representatives (1998–2009).
Harry W. Shlaudeman, 92, American diplomat.
José Tarciso de Souza, 67, Brazilian footballer (Grêmio, Goiás, Coritiba), bone cancer.
Bobby Treviño, 73, Mexican baseball player (California Angels).
Julia Vinograd, 74, American poet, colon cancer.

6
José de Anchieta Júnior, 53, Brazilian politician, Governor of Roraima (2007–2014), heart attack.
Thomas Baptiste, 89, Guyanese-born British actor (Coronation Street, Sunday Bloody Sunday).
Kuslan Budiman, 83, Indonesian poet and writer, pancreatic cancer.
Ace Cannon, 84, American saxophonist.
José Castillo, 37, Venezuelan professional baseball player (Pittsburgh Pirates, San Francisco Giants), traffic collision.
Robin Clark, 83, New Zealand-born British chemist.
Dónall Farmer, 81, Irish actor (Glenroe), film director and producer.
Győző Forintos, 83, Hungarian chess player and economist.
Al Gallagher, 73, American baseball player (San Francisco Giants), complications from diabetes.
Larry Hennig, 82, American professional wrestler (AWA, NWA, WWWF), kidney failure.
Ivan Hladush, 89, Ukrainian police officer and politician, Minister of Internal Affairs (1982–1990).
Joseph Joffo, 87, French author (A Bag of Marbles).
Laszlo Lorand, 95, Hungarian-American biochemist.
Jim Meehan, 66, American poker player.
Aleksandr Minayev, 64, Russian football player (Spartak Moscow, Dynamo Moscow, national team) and manager.
Murray Murphey, 90, American historian.
Jerome O'Shea, 87, Irish Gaelic footballer (South Kerry, Kerry, Munster).
Isiah Robertson, 69, American football player (Los Angeles Rams, Buffalo Bills), traffic collision.
Frank Joseph Rodimer, 91, American Roman Catholic prelate, Bishop of Paterson (1977–2004).
Tim Rossovich, 72, American football player (Philadelphia Eagles) and actor (The Long Riders, The Sting II).
Pete Shelley, 63, English musician and songwriter (Buzzcocks), heart attack.
Luis Valbuena, 33, Venezuelan professional baseball player (Chicago Cubs, Houston Astros, Los Angeles Angels), traffic collision.

7
Belisario Betancur, 95, Colombian politician, President (1982–1986), kidney infection.
Reby Cary, 98, American politician, member of the Texas House of Representatives (1979–1985).
Ljupka Džundeva, 84, Macedonian actress (Macedonian Bloody Wedding, Gypsy Magic).
Shmuel Flatto-Sharon, 88, Polish-born French-Israeli politician, member of the Knesset (1977–1981).
Carlos Gallisá, 85, Puerto Rican politician and independence advocate, cancer.
Mohammad Asrarul Haque, 76, Indian politician, member of the Lok Sabha (since 2009), heart attack.
Paul Henderson, 79, American journalist, Pulitzer Prize recipient (1982), lung cancer.
Ferenc Hirt, 51, Hungarian politician, MP (since 2006).
Håkan Jeppsson, 57, Swedish sports executive, chairman of Malmö FF (since 2010).
*The Mascara Snake, 70, American artist and musician (Captain Beefheart and his Magic Band), traffic collision.
Nguyễn Văn Trân, 101, Vietnamese politician, Minister of Transport (1955–1960).
Paul Niedermann, 91, German-French journalist and photographer.
Luigi Radice, 83, Italian football player (Milan) and manager (Torino, Inter Milan), complications from Alzheimer's disease.
Charles Weldon, 78, American actor and director.

8
Lyudmila Alexeyeva, 91, Russian human rights activist.
Evelyn Berezin, 93, American computer designer.
Jakelin Caal, 7, Guatemalan migrant child in US custody, dehydration, shock and liver failure.
Enrico Crispolti, 85, Italian art critic and historian.
Rosanell Eaton, 97, American civil rights activist.
Walter J. Floss Jr., 95, American politician, member of the New York State Senate (1979–1988).
Colin Guest, 81, Australian Test cricketer (Victoria, Western Australia).
Rod Jones, 54, American football player (Kansas City Chiefs), suicide by gunshot.
Michele Monti, 48, Italian Olympic judoka (2000, 2004), cancer.
Jamal Nebez, 85, Iraqi Kurdish linguist, mathematician and writer.
Roger, 12, Australian red kangaroo.
Jolanta Szczypińska, 61, Polish politician, member of the Sejm (since 2004), urinary tract disease.
Pentti Tiusanen, 69, Finnish politician, MP (1995–2011).
Wang Ruilin, 88, Chinese general and politician, member of the Central Military Commission (1995–2003).
Sir David Weatherall, 85, British physician and molecular geneticist.

9
Eric Anderson, 48, American basketball player (Indiana Hoosiers, New York Knicks).
Patrick Appleford, 93, British Anglican priest and hymn writer.
Mohammed Aruwa, 70, Nigerian politician, Senator for Kaduna State (1999–2007).
Yigal Bashan, 68, Israeli singer and composer.
Tim Bassett, 67, American basketball player (San Diego Conquistadors, New Jersey Nets, San Antonio Spurs), cancer.
Robert Bergland, 90, American politician, U.S. Representative from Minnesota's 7th district (1971–1977), Secretary of Agriculture (1977–1981).
William Blum, 85, American historian and author (Killing Hope, Rogue State), kidney failure.
C. Todd Conover, 79, American banking regulator, Comptroller of the Currency (1981-1985).
Melvin Dummar, 74, American suspected fraudster.
Tor Fretheim, 72, Norwegian journalist and children's writer.
Riccardo Giacconi, 87, Italian-born American astrophysicist, Nobel Prize laureate (2002).
John Joseph Gibbons, 94, American judge, Chief Judge of the U.S. Court of Appeals for the Third Circuit (1987–1990).
Bob Giggie, 85, American baseball player (Milwaukee Braves, Kansas City Athletics).
Elisapee Ishulutaq, 93, Canadian Inuit artist.
Rodney Kageyama, 77, American actor (Gung Ho, Pretty Woman, Showdown in Little Tokyo).
Peng Sixun, 99, Chinese medicinal chemist, member of the Chinese Academy of Engineering.
Guire Poulard, 76, Haitian Roman Catholic prelate, Archbishop of Port-au-Prince (2011–2017), pancreatic cancer.
Wendy Ramshaw, 79, British artist and designer.
Gordon Scholes, 87, Australian politician, Speaker of the House of Representatives (1975–1976), Minister for Defence (1983–1984) and Territories (1984–1987).
Michael Seymour, 86, British production designer (Alien), BAFTA winner (1980).
Yumiko Shige, 53, Japanese sailor, Olympic silver medallist (1996), breast cancer.
Dick Van Orden, 97, American rear admiral.
Heinz Weisenbach, 73, German Olympic ice hockey player.

10
Alvin Epstein, 93, American actor and director.
Sacha Hamilton, Duchess of Abercorn, 72, British aristocrat.
C. N. Balakrishnan, 84, Indian politician, kidney and heart failure.
Jean Baldassari, 92, French cyclist 
Bob and John, 15, American racehorse, euthanized.
Chiang Pin-kung, 85, Taiwanese politician, Minister of Economic Affairs (1993–1996), Vice President of the Legislative Yuan (2002–2005), multiple organ failure.
Fazio Fabbrini, 92, Italian politician, Senator (1968–1976) and Mayor of Siena (1965–1966).
Mushirul Hasan, 69, Indian historian.
Raoul Hunter, 92, Canadian sculptor.
Salihu Ibrahim, 83, Nigerian general, Chief of Army Staff (1990–1993).
Alan Brock MacFarlane, 94, Canadian lawyer and politician.
Johann Georg Reißmüller, 86, German journalist and publisher (Frankfurter Allgemeine Zeitung).
Robert Spaemann, 91, German Roman Catholic philosopher.
Xavier Tilliette, 97, French philosopher and theologian.

11
Winifred Griffin, 86, New Zealand Olympic swimmer (1956), British Empire Games silver medalist (1950), cancer.
Helga Henning, 81, German Olympic athlete.
Petrus Iilonga, 71, Namibian politician and political prisoner, Deputy Minister of Defence (since 2012).
John Henry Jackson, 80, American-born Canadian football player and restaurateur.
Harold L. Kahn, 88, American historian.
Eleanor Maccoby, 101, American psychologist.
Bill Siegel, 55, American documentary producer and director (The Trials of Muhammad Ali, The Weather Underground), heart attack.
Walter Smith, 98, English land surveyor, Director General of the Ordnance Survey (1977–1985).
Hiwi Tauroa, 91, New Zealand rugby union player (New Zealand Māori) and coach (Counties), Race Relations Conciliator (1980–1986).
Walter Williams, 35, Honduran footballer (Vida, Real Sociedad, national team), stroke.
Lia Wyler, 84, Brazilian translator (Harry Potter).
Sir Jack Zunz, 94, South African-born British civil engineer (Sydney Opera House).

12
Prince Casinader, 92, Sri Lankan politician, MP (1989–1994).
Carlos Cecconato, 88, Argentinian footballer (El Porvenir, Independiente, national team).
Iraj Danaeifard, 67, Iranian footballer (Taj, Pas Tehran, national team), heart attack.
Noël Duval, 88, French archaeologist.
Wilhelm Genazino, 75, German journalist and author.
Curtis Grimm, 65, American economist, pancreatic cancer.
Upali Kannangara, 67, Sri Lankan musician.
Ishwari Prasad Gupta, 87, Indian diplomat and civil servant, Lieutenant Governor of the Andaman and Nicobar Island (1996–2001).
W. Brantley Harvey Jr., 88, American politician, Lieutenant Governor of South Carolina (1975–1979), member of the South Carolina House of Representatives (1958–1975).
Ferenc Kósa, 81, Hungarian film director (The Upthrown Stone, Ten Thousand Days).
Bernard Lloyd, 84, Welsh actor (The Signalman).
James Lyons, 91, American admiral, Commander, U.S. Pacific Fleet (1985–1987).
Billy MacLeod, 76, American baseball player (Boston Red Sox).
Nelson Martínez, 67, Venezuelan politician, Minister of Petroleum (2017), President of PDVSA (2017).
Meng Lang, 57, Chinese poet and dissident, lung cancer.
Audrey Moore, 89, American politician, Alzheimer's disease.
William Newsom, 84, American judge.
Odile Rodin, 81, French actress (Futures Vedettes, Si Paris nous était conté) and model.
Vahid Sayadi Nasiri, 37, Iranian human rights activist and hunger striker, starvation.
Pavle Strugar, 85, Montenegrin military officer (Yugoslav People's Army) and convicted war criminal.
Jane Ellen Usher, 101, Belizean politician, MP (1979–1989) and President of the Senate (1989–1993).
Wang Lianzheng, 88, Chinese agronomist and politician, Vice Governor of Heilongjiang, Vice Minister of Agriculture.
Joseph Zeller, 100, American politician, member of the Pennsylvania House of Representatives (1971–1980).

13
Ajayan, 68, Indian film director (Perumthachan), heart attack.
Abdullah Ayub, 92, Malaysian civil servant, Chief Secretary to the Government (1979–1982), stroke.
Bill Fralic, 56, American football player (Atlanta Falcons, Detroit Lions, Pittsburgh Panthers), cancer.
John Fujioka, 93, American actor (The Last Flight of Noah's Ark, Who Finds a Friend Finds a Treasure, American Ninja).
Gao Jindian, 79, Chinese military officer (People's Liberation Army).
Seán Garland, 84, Irish politician, General Secretary of the Workers' Party (1977–1990).
Christopher Hooley, 90, British mathematician.
Matti Kassila, 94, Finnish film director (Komisario Palmun erehdys, The Harvest Month, The Scarlet Dove).
Sharmeen Khan, 46, Pakistani cricketer (national team), pneumonia.
Noah Klieger, 92, Israeli journalist and sports administrator (Maccabi Tel Aviv B.C.).
Väinö Korhonen, 91, Finnish Olympic fencer.
Sheena Mackintosh, 90, British Olympic alpine skier (1948, 1952).
Timothy C. May, 67, American technical and political writer (Cyphernomicon).
Mike Montler, 74, American football player (Buffalo Bills).
Lisa Peattie, 94, American anthropologist.
André Queillé, 87, French Olympic boxer (1952).
Tulsi Ramsay, 74, Indian film director (Zee Horror Show, Veerana, Guest House), heart attack.
J. Evan Sadler, 67, American hematologist (Washington University School of Medicine).
Don Webster, 79, Canadian-American television host (Upbeat, Bowling for Dollars, The Morning Exchange) and meteorologist (WEWS-TV).
Nancy Wilson, 81, American singer ("(You Don't Know) How Glad I Am"), Grammy winner (1965, 2005, 2007), kidney cancer.
Yuan Mu, 90, Chinese politician, Director of the State Council Research Office.

14
Vida Chenoweth, 90, American marimbist and ethnomusicologist.
Gilberto Duavit Sr., 84, Filipino entrepreneur and politician, founder of GMA Network Inc., member of the House of Representatives (1994–2001).
Salvador Flores Huerta, 84, Mexican Roman Catholic prelate, Bishop of Ciudad Lázaro Cárdenas (1993–2006).
Horst Herold, 95, German police officer, President of the Federal Criminal Police Office (1971–1981).
Amjad Hossain, 76, Bangladeshi actor and director (Golapi Ekhon Traine), complications from a stroke.
Patrick Daniel Koroma, 68, Sierra Leonean Roman Catholic prelate, Bishop of Kenema (since 2002).
Li Chengxiang, 87, Chinese ballet dancer and choreographer (Red Detachment of Women), Director of the National Ballet.
Remedios Loza, 69, Bolivian artisan, TV presenter and activist, member of the Plurinational Legislative Assembly (1998–2002), stomach cancer.
Zainuddin Maidin, 79, Malaysian politician, Minister of Information (2006–2008), heart attack.
Joe Osborn, 81, American bass guitarist (The Wrecking Crew).
Johnny Reagan, 92, American college baseball coach (Murray State Racers).
John Seedborg, 75, American football player (Washington Redskins).
Edmond Simeoni, 84, French politician and Corsican nationalism leader.
Joan Steinbrenner, 83, American philanthropist and sports executive, vice chairperson of the New York Yankees.
Thomas Thennatt, 65, Indian Roman Catholic prelate, Bishop of Gwalior (since 2016).
Eythor Thorlaksson, 88, Icelandic guitarist and composer.
Jean-Pierre Van Rossem, 73, Belgian economist and politician, member of the Chamber of Representatives (1991–1995) and the Flemish Parliament (1992–1995).

15
Jerry Chesnut, 87, American songwriter ("Good Year for the Roses", "T-R-O-U-B-L-E", "It's Four in the Morning").
Eryue He, 73, Chinese writer.
Ronald Gajraj, 65, Guyanese politician, Minister of Home Affairs (1999–2005), heart attack.
Ralph Koltai, 94, German-born British stage designer.
Milunka Lazarević, 86, Serbian chess player.
Arthur Maia, 56, Brazilian composer and musician, heart attack.
Philippe Moureaux, 79, Belgian politician, Minister-President of the French Community (1981–1985, 1988).
David Myles, 93, British politician, MP for Banffshire (1979–1983).
Robert Nelson, 74, American economist.
Dušan Nikolić, 65, Serbian footballer (Red Star Belgrade, Bolton Wanderers).
Marc Olivier, 78, Belgian politician, MP (1974–1995) and Flemish Councillor (1995–1999).
Guy Rétoré, 94, French actor.
Harald Stabell, 71, Norwegian lawyer.
Jacques Verdier, 61, French writer.
Ellsworth Wareham, 104, American surgeon.
Girma Wolde-Giorgis, 93, Ethiopian politician, President (2001–2013).
Anat Zamir, 56, Israeli model and actress, drug overdose.

16
Lawrence Allen, 97, British Olympic racewalker (1952).
Tom Brownlee, 83, Scottish footballer (Walsall).
Chiquetete, 70, Spanish flamenco and ballad singer, heart attack.
John H. Dorsey, 80, American politician, member of the New Jersey Senate (1978–1994).
Eraldo Isidori, 78, Italian politician, Deputy (2010–2012), complications from surgery.
Geeta Iyengar, 74, Indian yoga teacher, heart attack.
Karsten Johannessen, 93, Norwegian football manager (IK Start).
Lewis Judd, 88, American psychiatrist, chair of University of California, San Diego psychiatry department, director of the National Institute of Mental Health, natural causes.
Colin Kroll, 34, American entrepreneur, co-founder of Vine and HQ Trivia.
Eugène Philippe LaRocque, 91, Canadian Roman Catholic prelate, Bishop of Alexandria-Cornwall (1974–2002).
Lee Leonard, 89, American television host (The NFL Today, ESPN).
Juan L. Maldonado, 70, Mexican-born American education administrator, President of Laredo Community College (2007–2016).
Scott Matzka, 40, American ice hockey player (Grand Rapids Griffins, Örebro, Cardiff Devils), amyotrophic lateral sclerosis.
John Ford Noonan, 77, American actor (Adventures in Babysitting) and playwright, heart failure.
Mircea Petescu, 76, Romanian football player (Steaua București, UTA Arad) and manager (Sparta Rotterdam), Alzheimer's disease.
Anca Pop, 34, Romanian-Canadian singer-songwriter, traffic collision.
Giuseppe Sermonti, 93, Italian biologist and geneticist.
Joseph Thomin, 87, French racing cyclist.
Ron Waller, 85, American football player (Los Angeles Rams) and coach (San Diego Chargers).
T. K. Wetherell, 72, American politician and academic administrator, Speaker of the Florida House of Representatives (1991–1992), President of Florida State University (2003–2010).
John Wettaw, 79, American chemist (Northern Arizona University) and politician, member of the Arizona House of Representatives (1972–1992) and Senate (1993–2001).
Roy Woolcott, 79, English footballer (Tottenham Hotspur, Gillingham, Chelmsford City).

17
Arun Bhaduri, 75, Indian classical vocalist, respiratory disease.
Jon Bluming, 85, Dutch martial artist and actor.
Warren Boyd, 91, Australian Olympic swimmer (1948).
Lawrence Curry, 82, American politician, member of the Pennsylvania House of Representatives (1993–2012).
Gustavo L. Garcia, 84, American politician, mayor of Austin, Texas (2001–2003).
Zura Karuhimbi, c. 93, Rwandan traditional healer, saved refugees during Rwandan genocide.
Jorge Adolfo Carlos Livieres Banks, 87, Paraguayan Roman Catholic prelate, Bishop of Encarnación (1987–2003).
Frank LoVuolo, 94, American football player.
Galt MacDermot, 89, Canadian-American composer (Hair, Two Gentlemen of Verona) and pianist.
Penny Marshall, 75, American actress (Laverne & Shirley) and director (Big, A League of Their Own), heart failure.
Paul Meister, 92, Swiss Olympic fencer.
Amélie Mummendey, 74, German social psychologist.
Oribe, 62, Cuban-born American hairstylist, heart attack.
Rona Ramon, 54, Israeli educator and activist, cancer.
Francis Roache, 82, American police officer and politician, Boston Police commissioner (1985–1993).
James E. Rogers Jr., 71, American businessman (Duke Energy) and author.
Andrey Shcharbakow, 27, Belarusian footballer (BATE Borisov, Slutsk, Vitebsk), traffic collision.
David Shepherd, 94, American producer, director, and actor.
Raven Wilkinson, 83, American ballerina.

18
David C. H. Austin, 92, British rose breeder.
Alex Badeh, 61, Nigerian air force officer, Chief of the Defence Staff (2014–2015), shot.
Mike Barnard, 85, English footballer (Portsmouth) and cricketer (Hampshire), stroke.
Steve Daskewisz, 74, American actor and stuntman (Friday the 13th Part 2), complications from diabetes.
Ali Ejaz, 77, Pakistani actor (Tiger Gang, Chor Machaye Shor).
Paul Frazier, 51, American football player (New Orleans Saints), colon cancer.
Tulsi Giri, 92, Nepali politician, Prime Minister (1963, 1964–1965, 1975–1977), liver cancer.
Masao Ito, 90, Japanese neuroscientist.
Kazimierz Kutz, 89, Polish film director and politician.
Gerald Larner, 82, English music critic (The Guardian, The Times), pulmonary thrombosis.
Peter Masterson, 84, American writer (The Best Little Whorehouse in Texas), director (The Trip to Bountiful), and actor (The Exorcist), complications from a fall.
Robert Neild, 94, British economist.
María Jesús Rosa Reina, 44, Spanish boxer, WIBF world light flyweight champion (2003), cancer.
Lewis Ryder, 77, British theoretical physicist.
Shinobu Sekine, 75, Japanese judoka, Olympic champion (1972).
Bill Slater, 91, English footballer (Wolverhampton Wanderers, national team), Alzheimer's disease.
Saidul Anam Tutul, 68, Bangladeshi film director and editor, heart attack.
Raimo Vartia, 81, Finnish Olympic basketball player (1964).

19
Ron Abegglen, 81, American college basketball coach (Weber State Wildcats).
Colin Barlow, 83, English football player and executive (Manchester City).
Bhai, 83, Surinamese poet.
Russell Carollo, 63, American journalist (Dayton Daily News, Los Angeles Times), Pulitzer Prize winner (1998).
Jacques David, 87, French Roman Catholic prelate, Bishop of La Rochelle and Saintes (1985–1996) and Évreux (1996–2006).
Tömür Dawamat, 91, Chinese politician, Chairman of the Xinjiang Autonomous region (1985–1993).
Norman Gimbel, 91, American Hall of Fame songwriter ("Canadian Sunset", "The Girl from Ipanema", "Killing Me Softly with His Song"), Oscar winner (1980).
Mike Hiss, 77, American racing driver, cancer.
Mel Hutchins, 90, American basketball player (BYU Cougars, Milwaukee Hawks).
Hugh Jack, 89, Australian Olympic athlete (1956).
Marshall Long, 82, American politician, member of the Kentucky Legislature (1982–2002), mayor of Shelbyville, Kentucky (1972–1981).
Raúl Mata, 71, Mexican professional wrestler (EMLL, CWF, NWA Hollywood).
Guy Modeste, 64, French footballer (Saint-Étienne), cancer.
Owen M. Panner, 94, American federal judge, U.S. District Court Judge for the District of Oregon (since 1980).
Barbara Gardner Proctor, 85, American advertising executive, complications from hip surgery.
Geetha Salam, 72, Indian actor (Mani Koya Kurup, Malabar Wedding, Romans).
Bill Sellars, 93, British television director and producer (Doctor Who, All Creatures Great and Small, Triangle).
Andrzej Skupiński, 66, Polish actor.
Eva Tichauer, 100, German Holocaust survivor and author.
Marty Zendejas, 54, American football player (Nevada Wolf Pack), beaten.

20
F. W. Bernstein, 80, German poet and cartoonist.
Pascal F. Calogero Jr., 87, American judge, Louisiana Supreme Court Chief Justice (1973–2008).
Randall Carrington, 84, New Zealand cricketer.
Trevor Chinn, 81, New Zealand glaciologist.
Klaus Hagerup, 72, Norwegian author and actor (The Chieftain), colorectal cancer.
Mike Hughes, 78, Welsh football player (Exeter City, Chesterfield) and manager (Cirencester Town).
Dennis Johnson, 80, American mathematician and composer, complications from dementia.
Donald Moffat, 87, British-born American actor (The Thing, The Right Stuff, Clear and Present Danger), complications from a stroke.
Henning Palner, 86, Danish actor (Jetpiloter, Slottet, Terror).
Rocky Rees, 69, American football player and coach, cancer.

21
Dipali Barthakur, 77, Indian singer.
Gerard Bernacki, 76, Polish Roman Catholic prelate, Auxiliary Bishop of Katowice (1988–2012).
Lev Borodulin, 95, Soviet-born Israeli photographer.
Carlos Feller, 96, Argentine operatic bass singer.
Forrest Fezler, 69, American golfer and golf course designer, brain cancer.
Edda Göring, 80, German nurse.
Alias Guacho, 29, Ecuadorian FARC dissident and drug lord, shot.
Lars Hindmar, 97, Swedish racewalker.
Tom Leonard, 74, Scottish poet.
Daniela Payssé, 72, Uruguayan politician, Deputy (2005–2015) and Senator (since 2015), heart attack.
Prapanchan, 73, Indian writer, cancer.
Laya Raki, 91, German actress and dancer.

22
Paddy Ashdown, Baron Ashdown of Norton-sub-Hamdon, 77, British politician, high representative for Bosnia and Herzegovina (2002–2006), MP (1983–2001) and member of the House of Lords (since 2001), bladder cancer.
Rodel Batocabe, 52, Filipino politician, member of the House of Representatives (2010–2018), shot.
Jean Bourgain, 64, Belgian mathematician.
Kelly Burnett, 92, Canadian ice hockey player (New York Rangers, Montreal Royals).
Angélica García Arrieta, 60, Mexican public accountant and politician, Senator (since 2018) and founder of the National Regeneration Movement.
Dayton Hyde, 93, American conservationist.
Don Johnston, 89, South African Olympic swimmer.
Robert Kerketta, 86, Indian Roman Catholic prelate, Bishop of Dibrugarh (1970–1980) and Tezpur (1980–2007).
Gary N. Knoppers, 62, Canadian theologian, pancreatic cancer.
Jane Langton, 95, American author.
Jiko Luveni, 72, Fijian politician, Speaker of the Parliament (since 2014).
Roger Owen, 83, British historian (Middle East).
Sergey Psakhie, 66, Russian physicist.
Simcha Rotem, 94, Polish-Israeli resistance fighter, last surviving Warsaw Ghetto Uprising fighter.
Sir Peter Singer, 74, British jurist.
Roberto Suazo Córdova, 91, Honduran politician, President (1982–1986).
Talal bin Abdulaziz Al Saud, 87, Saudi prince and politician.
Willy Taminiaux, 79, Belgian politician, Minister in the Walloon Government (1994–1995 and 1995–1999) and Senator (1985–1995).
Jimmy Work, 94, American country singer-songwriter ("Making Believe").
Notable Indonesians killed in the Sunda Strait tsunami:
Aa Jimmy, 35, actor and comedian.
Dylan Sahara, 25, actress and presenter.
Herman Sikumbang, 36, guitarist (Seventeen).

23
Alfred Bader, 94, Austrian-born Canadian chemist and businessman.
Eileen Battersby, 60, American-born Irish literary critic (The Irish Times), traffic collision.
Nana Chudasama, 86, Indian jurist and public servant.
Hille Darjes, 75, German actress.
Barbara Kloka Hackett, 90, American judge, U.S. District Court Judge for the Eastern District of Michigan (1986–2000).
Troels Kløvedal, 75, Danish writer.
Tonko Lonza, 88, Croatian actor.
John Marshall, 60, Australian jockey, cancer.
Sophie Oluwole, 83, Nigerian philosopher.
Liza Redfield, 94, American conductor and pianist.
Don Richardson, 83, Canadian Christian missionary.
Elias M. Stein, 87, American mathematician.

24
Jozef Adamec, 76, Slovak football player (FC Spartak Trnava, national team) and manager (Inter Bratislava).
Guy Bacon, 82, Canadian politician.
Osvaldo Bayer, 91, Argentine writer (La Patagonia rebelde) and journalist.
Cynthia Ross Friedman, 47, Canadian biologist, aortic dissection.
Felipe Gómez Alonzo, 8, Guatemalan migrant child in US custody.
Patrice Martinez, 55, American actress (Three Amigos, The New Zorro, Beetlejuice).
Rosario Mazzola, 94, Italian Roman Catholic prelate, Bishop of Cefalù (1988–2000).
Dwijen Mukhopadhyay, 91, Indian composer and singer.
Jai Narain Prasad Nishad, 88, Indian politician.
Stanko Poklepović, 80, Croatian football player and manager (Hajduk Split, Persepolis, national team), kidney failure.
Jerry Riopelle, 77, American musician (The Parade), cancer.
Dionne Rose-Henley, 49, Jamaican Olympic athlete (1992, 1996), cancer.
Nirupam Sen, 72, Indian politician.
Mahmoud Hashemi Shahroudi, 70, Iranian cleric and politician, Chairman of the Expediency Discernment Council (since 2017), Chief Justice (1999–2009), cancer.
William C. Thompson, 94, American judge and politician, member of the New York State Senate (1965–1968).
Jaime Torres, 80, Argentine charango player.
James Calvin Wilsey, 61, American musician (Avengers).
Notable Mexican politicians killed in the 2018 Puebla helicopter crash:
Martha Érika Alonso, 45, Governor of Puebla (2018).
Rafael Moreno Valle Rosas, 50, Senator (2006–2010), Governor of Puebla (2011–2017).

25
Bill Baillie, 84, New Zealand Olympic runner (1964).
Werner Braun, 100, Israeli photojournalist.
John Briggs, 84, American baseball player (Chicago Cubs, Cleveland Indians).
Nirendranath Chakravarty, 94, Indian poet and writer, creator of Bhaduri Moshai, heart attack.
Walter Chilsen, 95, American politician, member of the Wisconsin Senate (1967–1990).
Noel Derrick, 92, Australian Olympic ice hockey player.
Larry Eisenberg, 99, American biomedical engineer and science fiction writer, acute myeloid leukemia.
Álex Figueroa, 57, Chilean politician and physician, Minister of Health (1996–2000), liver cancer.
István Levente Garai, 63, Hungarian physician and politician, MP (1994–1998, 2004–2014).
William Harbison, 96, British Royal Air Force fighter pilot during World War II.
Thomas Hayden, 92, Irish Olympic weightlifter (1960).
Yoshitada Konoike, 78, Japanese politician, MP (1986–1993, since 1995).
Law Hieng Ding, 83, Malaysian politician, Minister of Science, Technology and Environment (1990–2004), MP (1982–2008).
Conrad Leslie, 95, American businessman and crop forecaster.
Michael Maclear, 89, British-Canadian journalist and documentarist.
Sulagitti Narasamma, 98, Indian midwife, lung disease.
Chester Nelsen Jr., 96, American Olympic cyclist (1948).
Grazia Nidasio, 87,  Italian comic artist and illustrator.
Vicente Pimentel Jr., 72, Filipino politician, Governor of Surigao del Sur (2001–2010, 2016–2018).
Baldur Ragnarsson, 88, Icelandic writer.
Nancy Roman, 93, American astronomer (NASA), early developer of the Hubble Space Telescope.
Sigi Schmid, 65, German-American Hall of Fame soccer manager (LA Galaxy, Columbus Crew, Seattle Sounders), heart attack.
Syed Ali Raza Abidi, 46, Pakistani politician, MNA (2013–2018), shot.
Rosalyn Terborg-Penn, 77, American historian and author.
Terence Wheeler, 82, British novelist and playwright.

26
Theodore Antoniou, 83, Greek composer and conductor, complications from Alzheimer's disease.
Wendy Beckett, 88, British nun and art historian.
Gerson Camata, 77, Brazilian politician, Governor of Espírito Santo (1983–1986), shot.
Fabio Carpi, 93, Italian film director (Necessary Love) and novelist, Bagutta Prize (1998).
Penny Cook, 61, Australian actress (A Country Practice, E Street, Neighbours), cancer.
John Culver, 86, American politician, member of the U.S. Senate (1975–1981) and House of Representatives (1965–1975).
Haldane Duncan, 78, Scottish television producer and director (Take the High Road, Taggart, Emmerdale).
Herb Ellis, 97, American actor (Dragnet, The Killing, The Fortune Cookie).
Maeng Yu-na, 29, South Korean singer, heart attack.
Roy J. Glauber, 93, American physicist, Nobel Prize laureate (2005).
Jorge Grau, 88, Spanish artist and filmmaker (Let Sleeping Corpses Lie).
Sir Hew Hamilton-Dalrymple, 92, British aristocrat and military officer.
Guillermo Hincapié Orozco, 92, Colombian politician, Mayor of Medellín (1977–1978).
Tomokatsu Kitagawa, 67, Japanese politician, MP (2003–2009, since 2012).
Pete Lovrich, 76, American baseball player (Kansas City Athletics).
Don McKay, 93, American actor (West Side Story).
Mike Metcalf, 79, English footballer (Wrexham, Chester City).
Sono Osato, 99, American dancer and actress.
Lawrence Roberts, 81, American computer scientist.
Ronil Singh, 33, Fijian-born American police officer, shot.
Morton Sobell, 101, American engineer and convicted Soviet spy.
Margaret Stones, 98, Australian botanical illustrator.
Sir Peter Swinnerton-Dyer, 91, British mathematician.
Elizabeth Zachariadou, 87, Greek historian.

27
Juan Bautista Agüero, 83, Paraguayan footballer (Sevilla, Real Madrid, national team).
Frank Blaichman, 96, Polish resistance member during World War II.
Albert Burstein, 96, American politician.
Joe Camacho, 90, American baseball coach (Texas Rangers).
Jim Davis, 77, American basketball player (Atlanta Hawks, Houston Rockets, Detroit Pistons), cancer.
Mãe Stella de Oxóssi, 93, Brazilian ialorixá and writer, stroke.
Giorgio Degola, 95, Italian politician, Senator (1976–1987).
Jean Dumontier, 83, Canadian architect, cancer.
Brian Jordan, 86, English footballer (Rotherham United, York City).
Robert Kerman, 71, American actor (Debbie Does Dallas, Cannibal Holocaust, Cannibal Ferox).
Miúcha, 81, Brazilian singer and composer, respiratory failure.
Cheenu Mohan, 62, Indian actor, heart attack.
Richard Arvin Overton, 112, American supercentenarian, nation's oldest living World War II veteran, complications from pneumonia.
Tadeusz Pieronek, 84, Polish Roman Catholic prelate, Auxiliary Bishop of Sosnowiec (1992–1998) and Rector of Pontifical Academy of Theology (1998–2004).
Sir Fenton Ramsahoye, 89, Guyanese politician, Attorney General (1961–1964), MP (1961–1973).
Børge Ring, 97, Danish animator (Anna & Bella, Heavy Metal, We're Back! A Dinosaur's Story), Oscar winner (1985).
Wilfred Shuchat, 98, Canadian scholar and rabbi.
Bumper Tormohlen, 81, American basketball player (Atlanta Hawks).
Warren Wells, 76, American football player (Detroit Lions, Oakland Raiders), heart failure.

28
Abdelmalek Benhabyles, 97, Algerian politician, acting President (1992).
Adelio Cogliati, 70, Italian lyricist ("Cose della vita", "Più bella cosa", "Adesso tu").
Iaia Fiastri, 84, Italian screenwriter (Basta guardarla, Bread and Chocolate, When Women Lost Their Tails).
Elisa Frota Pessoa, 97, Brazilian experimental physicist, pneumonia.
Toshiko Fujita, 68, Japanese voice actress (Digimon Adventure, Fist of the North Star), breast cancer.
Santiago García Aracil, 78, Spanish Roman Catholic prelate, Bishop of Jaén (1988–2004) and Archbishop of Mérida-Badajoz (2004–2015).
Al Hawkes, 88, American bluegrass musician.
Peter Hill-Wood, 82, British businessman and football executive (Arsenal).
Seydou Badian Kouyaté, 90, Malian writer and politician, lyricist of national anthem "Le Mali".
Frank L. Lambert, 100, American chemist.
Georges Loinger, 108, French resistance fighter.
Edgar Maalouf, 83, Lebanese military officer and politician, MP (2005–2013).
Christine McGuire, 92, American singer (McGuire Sisters).
Attila Miklósházy, 87, Hungarian-born Canadian Roman Catholic prelate, Bishop of the Hungarian Emigrants (1989–2006).
Robert Edward Mulvee, 88, American Roman Catholic prelate, Bishop of Providence (1997–2005) and Wilmington (1985–1995).
Amos Oz, 79, Israeli author (My Michael, A Perfect Peace, A Tale of Love and Darkness) and journalist, cancer.
Bre Payton, 26, American conservative writer (The Federalist), complications from meningitis and swine flu.
Shehu Shagari, 93, Nigerian politician, President (1979–1983).
Colleen Smith, 93, American baseball player (Grand Rapids Chicks).
Tom Weisner, 69, American politician, mayor of Aurora, Illinois (2005–2016), cancer.
Oliver Wright, 71, Jamaican Olympic boxer (1968, 1972), heart attack.
Yevgeni Zimin, 71, Russian Hall of Fame ice hockey player, Olympic champion (1968, 1972).

29
Bill Brundige, 70, American football player (Washington Redskins).
David Cavanagh, British music writer and journalist.
Scott Doran, 44, Irish Gaelic footballer.
Agneta Eckemyr, 68, Swedish actress (The Kentucky Fried Movie, The Island at the Top of the World, Christopher's House), complications from Alzheimer's disease.
Brian Garfield, 79, American author (Death Wish, Hopscotch, Death Sentence), Parkinson's disease.
Yehoshua Glazer, 91, Israeli footballer (Maccabi Tel Aviv, national team).
Judith Rich Harris, 80, American psychology researcher and author (The Nurture Assumption).
Syed Jahangir, 83, Bangladeshi painter.
Norbert Kox, 73, American outsider artist, heart attack.
Ringo Lam, 63, Hong Kong film director (Aces Go Places IV, City on Fire, Maximum Risk), heart attack.
Liang Weiyan, 89, Chinese electrical engineer, member of the Chinese Academy of Engineering.
Ling Te-Sheng, 90, Taiwanese Olympic athlete.
Rosenda Monteros, 83, Mexican actress (A Woman's Devotion, The Magnificent Seven, Tiara Tahiti).
Aldo Parisot, 100, Brazilian-born American cellist.
Maria Isaura Pereira de Queiróz, 100, Brazilian sociologist.
Carlos Sánchez, 83, Colombian actor (Juan Valdez).
Roy Skeggs, 84, British film producer.
Ted Urness, 81, Canadian football player (Saskatchewan Roughriders).
Bill Watson, 87, Australian Test cricketer.
Dame June Whitfield, 93, English actress (Terry and June, Last of the Summer Wine, Absolutely Fabulous).

30
Cameron M. Alexander, 86, American Baptist minister.
Larry Austin, 88, American composer.
Seymour S. Cohen, 101, American biochemist.
Karel Engel, 78, Czech Olympic wrestler (1972).
Pepita Ferrari, 66, Canadian documentary film director.
Claude Gingras, 87, Canadian journalist and music critic (La Presse).
Marc Hauser, 66, American photographer.
Dick Helling, 68, Dutch footballer (Ajax, SC Telstar, FC Volendam).
Edgar Hilsenrath, 92, German writer (The Nazi and the Barber, The Story of the Last Thought), complications from pneumonia.
Jack Kahl, 78, American businessman.
Joan Kaufman, 83, American baseball player (All-American Girls Professional Baseball League).
Don Lusk, 105, American animator and director (Pinocchio, 101 Dalmatians, Peanuts).
Warren Plunkett, 98, American football player (Cleveland Rams), complications from pneumonia.
Ron Reiffel, 86, Australian footballer (Richmond).
Anthony Revell, 83, British Royal Navy medical officer, Surgeon-General of the British Armed Services (1994–1997), cancer.
Ambrose Schindler, 101, American football player and actor (The Wizard of Oz).
Mrinal Sen, 95, Indian film director (Bhuvan Shome, Mrigayaa, Khandhar), heart attack.
Calvin Stamp, 60, Jamaican Olympic weightlifter.
Héctor Timerman, 65, Argentine journalist and politician, Minister of Foreign Affairs (2010–2015), liver cancer.
Blandine Verlet, 76, French harpsichordist.

31
Maya Casabianca, 77, French-Israeli singer.
Dean Ford, 72, Scottish singer (Marmalade) and songwriter ("Reflections of My Life", "I See the Rain").
Etty Fraser, 87, Brazilian actress (Beto Rockfeller, Durval Discos, Cristina Wants to Get Married), heart failure.
Urbie Green, 92, American jazz trombonist.
Kató Havas, 98, Hungarian classical violinist and teacher.
Keylla Hernandéz, 45, Puerto Rican journalist (WAPA), liver cancer.
Kobi Kambon, 75, American psychologist.
Kader Khan, 81, Afghan-born Indian-Canadian actor (Daag, Family: Ties of Blood, Tevar) and screenwriter, complications from progressive supranuclear palsy.
Mark Killilea Jnr, 79, Irish politician, MEP (1987–1999), TD (1977–1982).
Elazar Mordechai Koenig, 73, Israeli Orthodox rabbi.
Nicola L, 81, French-Moroccan multidisciplinary artist.
Loknath, 91, Indian actor (Bangaarada Manushya).
Warren MacKenzie, 94, American potter.
Richard Marks, 75, American film editor (Apocalypse Now, The Godfather Part II, Broadcast News).
Christian Mohn, 92, Norwegian ski jumper and sports official, president of the Norwegian Ski Federation (1978–1980).
Nils Oskar Nilsson, 83, Swedish politician, Riksdagen (2006–2010).
Gennaro Papa, 93, Italian politician, Deputy (1961–1963, 1968–1976).
Al Reinert, 71, American screenwriter (Apollo 13, Final Fantasy: The Spirits Within) and documentarian (For All Mankind), cancer.
Simon Britto Rodrigues, 64, Indian politician, MLA (2006–2011), heart attack.
Ray Sawyer, 81, American singer (Dr. Hook & the Medicine Show).
Eric L. Schwartz, 71, American neuroscientist.
István Seregély, 87, Hungarian Roman Catholic prelate, Archbishop of Eger (1987–2007).
Antônio Salvador Sucar, 79, Brazilian basketball player, world champion (1963) and Olympic bronze medalist (1960, 1964).
Gülriz Sururi, 89, Turkish actress and author.
Peter Thompson, 76, English footballer (Liverpool, Bolton Wanderers, national team).

References

2018-12
 12